Bautzen I is an electoral constituency (German: Wahlkreis) represented in the Bundestag. It elects one member via first-past-the-post voting. Under the current constituency numbering system, it is designated as constituency 156. It is located in eastern Saxony, comprising most of the Bautzen district.

Bautzen I was created for the 2009 federal election. Since 2017, it has been represented by Karsten Hilse of the Alternative for Germany (AfD).

Geography
Bautzen I is located in eastern Saxony. As of the 2021 federal election, it comprises the entirety of the Bautzen district, excluding five south-western municipalities near Dresden: Arnsdorf, Großröhrsdorf, Ottendorf-Okrilla, Radeberg, and Wachau (these five have been part of Dresden II – Bautzen II since 2009).

The constituency is in the central area of Sorbian settlement and of the Upper Sorbian language, of which many cultural institutions are housed in the town of Bautzen/Budyšin.

History
Bautzen I was created in 2009 and contained parts of the abolished constituencies of Kamenz – Hoyerswerda – Großenhain and Bautzen – Weißwasser. In the 2009 election, it was constituency 157 in the numbering system. Since 2013, it has been number 156. Its borders have not changed since its creation.

Members
The constituency was first represented by Maria Michalk of the Christian Democratic Union (CDU) from 2009 to 2017. Karsten Hilse of the AfD was elected in 2017 and re-elected in 2021.

Election results

2021 election

2017 election

2013 election

2009 election

References

Federal electoral districts in Saxony
2009 establishments in Germany
Constituencies established in 2009
Bautzen (district)